This list of streets and roads in Allahabad covers all of the major streets and roads in Allahabad, India. Streets in India are often synonymous to 'roads'. They are also called Marg or sometimes Path in Hindi.

List
 Bank Road
 Auckland Road
 Noorullah Road The road starts from Allahabad Junction and end towards Karelabagh
 Cariappa Road
 Clive Road
 Colvin Road
 Cooper Road
 Dr. Lohia Road
 Drummond Road The road was named after Major General Henry Drummond who was posted in Japan during World War II( during the British Raj ), In later years his son Allen Henry Drummond became A.D.M ( Additional District Magistrate ) somewhere Uttar Pradesh in  North India. Allen Drummond passed on in 2003.
 Dr Muzaffar Nasim Road it is major road in GTB Nagar kareli Allahabad.
Elgin Road - It is a major road in Civil Lines.
 Jawaharlal Nehru Road
 Hamilton Road - Now renamed as Amarnath Jha Marg.
 Hastings Road runs north to south in central Allahabad and has been divided into two renamed Nyaya Marg which runs from Muir Road to PD Tandon Marg, and CSP Marg which runs from PD Tandon Marg to Smith Road.
 Kamla Nehru Road
 Katra Road
 Kidgunj Road
 Kutchery Road
 Lala Lajpat Rai Road is developed as a 'model road'.
 Lawrence Road
 Leader Road
 Liddle Road
 Lowther Road
 Luker Road
 MG Marg
 Mahatama Gandhi Marg, also known as MG Marg is one of the major streets in Allahabad, named after Mahatma Gandhi. It stretches from Allahabad High Court in the east making intersection with PD Tondon Marg and Nyaya Marg, passing through Civil Lines,  to the west till in ends at the esplanade. It is bordered by several shops, malls and a number of historical and religious buildings and offices and notable landmarks like All Saints Cathedral and Alfred Park in the north. It intersects with Sardar Patel Marg making Subash Cross, a notable town square of the city.
 Muir Road
 Nawab Yusuf Road
 Noorullah Road
 Park Road
 Patrika Marg
 PD Tondon Marg
 Sardar Patel Marg
 SN Marg
 Sarojini Naidu Marg and formerly Queen's Road is a major road in Allahabad which is lined with many public building and government offices and notable landmarks like General Post Office, All Saints Cathedral, Allahabad, Telegraph Office and Government Press.
 Smith Road
 Stanley Road
 Strachey Road
 Tashkent Marg
 Thornhill Road
 Triveni Road
 University Road
 Zero Road connects Ghantaghar to Rambagh. Important places around Zero Road are Zero Road Interstate Bus Stand, Ajanta Talkies, Mansarovar talkies, Chandralok Talkies.

References

Transport in Allahabad
Allahabad-related lists
Allahabad
Roads in Uttar Pradesh
Streets in India by city
Allahabad